Artyom Grigoryevich Falyan (27 December 1919 — 24 September 1977) was a Soviet Armenian football manager and a player.

External links
 

1919 births
Footballers from Baku
1977 deaths
Armenian footballers
Azerbaijani footballers
Soviet footballers
FC Ararat Yerevan players
Armenian football managers
Azerbaijani football managers
Soviet football managers
Soviet Armenians
Ethnic Armenian sportspeople
FC Chernomorets Novorossiysk managers
FC Ararat Yerevan managers
FC Zenit Saint Petersburg managers
FC Shakhtar Donetsk managers
FC Alga Bishkek managers
FC Kairat managers
Association football midfielders
Neftçi PFK players